Theresia (minor planet designation: 295 Theresia) is a typical Main belt asteroid. It was discovered by Johann Palisa on 17 August 1890 in Vienna.

References

External links 
 
 

000295
Discoveries by Johann Palisa
Named minor planets
000295
000295
18900817